Lewis Edwin Payson (September 17, 1840 – October 4, 1909) was a U.S. Representative from Illinois.

Biography
Born in Providence, Rhode Island, Payson moved with his parents to Illinois in 1852. He attended the common schools and Lombard University, Galesburg, Illinois. After concluding his law studies, he was admitted to the bar and commenced practice in Ottawa, Illinois in 1862. He moved to Pontiac, Illinois, in January 1865 and continued the practice of law. He served as judge of the county court 1869-1873.

Payson was elected as a Republican to the Forty-seventh and to the four succeeding Congresses (March 4, 1881 – March 3, 1891). He served as chairman of the Committee on Public Lands (Fifty-first Congress). He resumed the practice of law.

Death
Payson died in Washington, D.C., October 4, 1909 and was interred in Rock Creek Cemetery.

Legacy
A number of towns are named after Lewis Payson  including Payson, Arizona, and Payson, Utah.

References

Sources

1840 births
1909 deaths
American people of Frisian descent
Lombard College alumni
Illinois state court judges
Republican Party members of the United States House of Representatives from Illinois
19th-century American politicians
People from Ottawa, Illinois
People from Pontiac, Illinois
19th-century American judges
Burials at Rock Creek Cemetery